El Hierro, nicknamed Isla del Meridiano (the "Meridian Island"), is the second-smallest and farthest-south and -west of the Canary Islands (an autonomous community of Spain), in the Atlantic Ocean off the coast of Africa, with a population of 10,968 (2019). Its capital is Valverde. At , it is the second-smallest of the eight main islands of the Canaries.

Name 

The name El Hierro, although spelled like the Spanish word for 'iron', is not related to that word. The H in the name of the metal is derived from the F of Latin ferrum (compare  higo for 'fig'), a phonetic mutation that was complete by the end of the Middle Ages.

The confusion with the name of the metal had effects on the international naming of the island. As early as the 16th century, maps and texts called the island after the word for 'iron' in other languages: Portuguese Ferro, French l'île de Fer, and Latin Insula Ferri.

Nevertheless, the origin of the name ero or erro or yerro is not definitely known. It is thought to be derived from one of several words in the Guanche language of the pre-Hispanic inhabitants, known as Bimbaches.  Juan de Abreu Galindo (in a manuscript translated and published by George Glas in 1764) gives the native name of the island as Esero (or Eseró), meaning 'strong'.
Richard Henry Major, however, in notes on his translation of Le Canarien, observes that the Guanche word hero or herro, meaning 'cistern', could easily have lapsed into hierro by a process of folk etymology. It is believed that the Bimbaches had to construct cisterns to save fresh rainwater. The Gran diccionario guanche gives the meaning of the Guanche word hero in Spanish as "fuente" ('spring [water source]').

History 

The ancient natives of the island, called Bimbaches, were subjected to Spanish rule by Jean de Béthencourt (d.1425) – more by the process of negotiation than by military action. Béthencourt had as his ally and negotiator Augeron, brother of the island's native monarch. Augeron had been captured years before by the Europeans and now served as mediator between the Europeans and the Guanches. In return for control over the island, Béthencourt promised to respect the liberty of the natives, but his son eventually broke his promise, selling many of the bimbaches into slavery. Many Frenchmen and Galicians subsequently settled on the island. There was a revolt of the natives against the harsh treatment of the governor Lázaro Vizcaíno, but it was suppressed.

Landslides and tsunami
There is evidence of at least three major landslides that have affected El Hierro in the last few hundred thousand years. The most recent of these was the 'El Golfo' landslide that occurred about 15,000 years ago, involving collapse of the northern flank of the island. The landslide formed the El Golfo valley and created a debris avalanche with a volume of 150–180 km3. Turbidite deposits related to this landslide have been recognized in drill cores from the Agadir Basin to the north of the Canary Islands. Detailed analysis of these deposits suggests that the slope failure did not occur as a single event but a series of smaller failures over a period of hours or days. Local tsunami are likely to have been triggered by these landslides but no evidence has been found to confirm this.

2011 seismic activity

The Instituto Vulcanológico de Canarias (Volcanological Institute of the Canary Islands) and National Geographic Institute's seismic monitoring station located in Valverde detected increased seismic activity beginning on 17 July 2011. The seismic monitoring network was increased in density on 21 July to allow better detection and location of the seismic events. There was an earthquake swarm with in excess of 400 minor tremors between 20 July and 24 July; by 27 July a further 320 earthquakes had been recorded. On 25 August there were reports that some horizontal deformation had been detected, but that there was no unusual vertical deformation. At that time, the total number of tremors had exceeded 4,000.

Between 4;15 and 4:20 a.m. on 10 October 2011 the earthquake swarm changed behaviour and produced a harmonic tremor. Harmonic tremors are produced by magma movements and can indicate that an eruption has begun.  Later the same day a small submarine eruption began, 7 km south of La Restinga. On 11 October the volcanic threat level at La Restinga was raised from "yellow" to "red" after minor rockfalls on the slopes above the town. Temporary evacuation of the 600 inhabitants was ordered and, despite a reduction in activity, they were still unable to return 20 days later.
As of 7 November 2011 a confirmed surtseyan type of eruption phase has started at the fissure. On 4 December 2011 the eruption was ongoing with vigorous phreatic bubbles emerging. After the 2011 eruption, fossils of single-celled marine organisms were found in restingolites, a type of tephra, that were released into the water.

Climate 

The climate of El Hierro depends on the area. The climate ranges are from subtropical Mediterranean (Csa / Csb) in the center of the island, to semi-arid (BSh) and to a desert climate (BWh) in coastal parts (according to the Köppen climate classification). Although the temperatures are very influenced by the ocean. This is the climate chart from El Hierro Airport, which is the only airport in the island and also the island capital's airport:

Geography, flora and fauna

El Hierro's size and geography supports entirely endemic species including the critically endangered El Hierro giant lizard (Gallotia simonyi), for which there is a captive breeding programme, allowing its reintroduction.

The non-barren parts of the interior rely on relief precipitation, not much more than the average of 19 rainfall days per year, high relative humidity and geothermal springs. This non-arid parts have thermophilous (geothermal heat-liking) juniper clumps and a pine forest with other evergreens.
In 2000, El Hierro was designated by UNESCO as a Biosphere Reserve, with 60% of its territory protected to preserve its natural and cultural diversity. Among cetaceans in these waters, it is notable that several species of lesser known beaked whales inhabit around the island.

Like the rest of the Canary Islands chain, El Hierro is volcanic and sharply mountainous. One eruption has to date been recorded on the island, but is not confirmed: from the Volcan de Lomo Negro vent in 1793, lasting a month. A submarine eruption occurred, however, offshore La Restinga village in 2011/2012. Except as landscaped at its harbour towns the shore is rocky and in places precipitous.

El Hierro is a  island, formed late, about 1.2 million years ago after three successive eruptions, the island emerged from the ocean as a triangle of basaltic dykes topped with a volcanic cone more than 2,000 metres high. With continued activity resulting in the island expanding to have the largest number of volcanoes in the Canaries (over 500 cones, another 300 covered by more recent deposits), together with approximately 70 caves and volcanic galleries, including the Cueva de Don Justo whose collection of channels exceeds 6 km. Landslides, plant erosion and seasonal wind erosion have reduced the size and height of the island.

Tourism and transportation

Like all of the Canary Islands, El Hierro is a tourist destination. It is served by a small airport—El Hierro Airport at Valverde—and a ferry terminal at Puerto de la Estaca, both of which connect to Tenerife.  Though El Hierro has a Parador, hotel accommodations are generally in small family enterprises; as a UNESCO World Biosphere Reserve, El Hierro has limited construction to less than half of its total surface and buildings to two floors, maintaining its traditional look and social structure more than the other six major Canary Islands.

Political organization 
The island is part of the province of Santa Cruz de Tenerife, and includes three municipalities:

Valverde is situated in the northeast and Frontera in the west, both contain several villages.

The seat of the island government (cabildo insular) is in the town of Valverde, which houses approximately half of the island's population.

The "Meridian Island" 

El Hierro was used in various parts of Europe for more than 500 years as the prime meridian, especially outside of the future British Empire. By the 2nd century CE, Ptolemy already considered a definition of the zero meridian based on the westernmost piece of land in the (known) world, giving a few maps with only positive, eastern longitudes.

In 1634, in France, as ruled by Louis XIII and his minister Richelieu, it was decided that Ferro's meridian should be used as a key reference of maps, in consideration of the island's historic meridian and status as the westernmost-known land of peoples of the 'Known World'. Flores Island is the westernmost Azore discovered by the Portuguese navigators in the early 15th century—after the First Voyage of Columbus in 1492 scholars and cartographers sometimes grouped them among the new world.  The Paris elite considered El Hierro to be exactly 20° west of the Paris meridian (th of its relevant parallel of the globe).

Old international maps (outside of Anglo-North American realms) often have a common grid with Paris degrees at the top and Ferro degrees (offset by 20 from Paris) at the bottom. Louis Feuillée also worked on this problem in 1724.

Festivals 
The most important festival of El Hierro is the Bajada de la Virgen de los Reyes, held every four years, on the first Saturday of July (the last occasion was in 2017, and the next will be in 2021). During the festival, the Virgin of the Kings (Virgen de los Reyes, patron saint of the island of El Hierro) is taken from her sanctuary in La Dehesa (in the municipality of La Frontera) and carried to the capital of the island, Valverde, making a tour of 44 kilometres and running through all the towns of El Hierro.

The annual festival of the Virgin is celebrated every September 24.

Natural symbols 

The official natural symbols associated with El Hierro are Gallotia simonyi machadoi (El Hierro giant lizard) and Juniperus phoenicea (Sabina).

Energy 

According to the Ministry for Industry, Tourism and Commerce, El Hierro hopes to become the first island in the world to be self-sufficient for electrical energy. This will be achieved through a €54 million project combining a greater than 11-megawatt wind farm and two hydroelectric projects.

This hydro and wind-power project, created by the local Gorona del Viento El Hierro consortium with financial aid from the European Union, and officially inaugurated in 2015, consists of five E-70 wind turbines capable of producing 11.5 megawatts of wind power to supply electricity for approximately 11,000 residents, an additional number of tourists, and three water desalination facilities. The hybrid wind/pumped hydro storage system stores surplus wind power by pumping water up 700 metres (approximately 2,300 feet) to the crater of an extinct volcano.  When winds are calm or when demand exceeds supply, water is released from the crater to generate 11.3 MW of electricity, filling a smaller artificial basin created at the bottom of the extinct volcano. Water in the lower basin is then pumped back up again to the upper reservoir when there is excess wind power.

The closed-loop hybrid wind/hydro system is expected to save approximately US$4M per year (calculated with January 2011 oil prices) previously spent on about 40,000 barrels of crude oil imported annually, attempting to make the island completely self-sufficient for electrical energy.

2016 was the first whole year for the power plant and it reached 40.7% of the total demand, reducing consumption of diesel by 6,000 tonnes. In 2017, the share climbed to 46.5%. The installation also powers a desalination plant that provides fresh water.

In early 2018, El Hierro covered its entire electricity demand between 25 January and 12 February with its renewable resource base, avoiding the use of polluting energy sources for more than 560 hours in 2018—and a total of almost 2,000 hours since it started operating.

Bimbache openART Festival 
The Bimbache openART Festival and Global Initiative for Arts and Sustainability, founded in 2005 by German-born guitarist Torsten de Winkel and other community activists, is a non-profit effort at creating an interdisciplinary platform which seeks to bridge traditional divides, both on a musical and human level, in a globalizing world. The festival is a contribution of the international artist community to El Hierro's "Sustainable Island" program and collaborates with scientists and sustainability-oriented organizations from around the world.

El Hierro in literature 
The island of Hierro is mentioned (1) in Umberto Eco's novel The Island of the Day Before (1994), about a 17th-century Italian nobleman trapped on an island on the International Date Line; (2) in Christopher Isherwood's short story "The Turn Round the World", collected in his Exhumations (1966); and (3) in the first chapter of Steven Callahan's (1986) maritime chronicle "Adrift", in which El Hierro is his final port of departure for an ill-fated Atlantic crossing.

See also 

 List of volcanoes in Spain
 Prime meridian

Notes

External links 

 El Hierro – official tourism website of the Canary Islands
 
 http://euanmearns.com/el-hierro-fourth-quarter-2018-performance-update/
 

 
Islands of the Canary Islands
Volcanoes of the Canary Islands
Meridians (geography)
Biosphere reserves of Spain
Protected areas of the Canary Islands